The Tecuci is a left tributary of the river Vedea in Romania. It discharges into the Vedea near Didești.

References

Rivers of Romania
Rivers of Argeș County
Rivers of Teleorman County